Potassium telluride is an inorganic compound with a chemical formula K2Te. It is formed from potassium and tellurium, making it a telluride. Potassium telluride is a white powder. Like rubidium telluride and caesium telluride, it can be used as an ultraviolet detector in space. Its crystal structure is similar to other tellurides, which have an anti-fluorite structure.

Production 
Tellurium will react with melting potassium cyanide (KCN) producing potassium telluride. It also can produced by direct combination of potassium and tellurium, usually in liquid ammonia solvent:

Reactions 
Adding potassium telluride to water and letting the filtrate stand in air leads to an oxidation reaction that generates potassium hydroxide (KOH) and elemental tellurium:

References 
 Sangester J. and Pelton AD; Journal of Phase Equilibria, 1997, 18(4) p. 394.

Potassium compounds
Tellurides
Fluorite crystal structure